Chester Valentine House, also known as Strathmore Cottage, is a historic Strathmore model Sears kit house located at Saranac Lake, Franklin County, New York.  It was built in 1932, and is a one-story, L-shaped plan dwelling in the Tudor Revival style.  It features a gabled entrance, diamond-pane casement windows, and a prominent brick and stone chimney.

It was added to the National Register of Historic Places in 2015.

References

Houses on the National Register of Historic Places in New York (state)
Houses completed in 1932
Tudor Revival architecture in New York (state)
National Register of Historic Places in Franklin County, New York
1932 establishments in New York (state)
Sears Modern Homes